Leslie "Tiger" Fitzpatrick (born November 11, 1978 in Port of Spain) is a former Trinidadian soccer player.

Career

College
Fitzpatrick came to the United States to play college soccer, and spent four years at Columbia University, where he was named All-Ivy League his senior year. In 2016, Leslie received his Masters of Science in Education with a focus in Sports Administration from the University of Miami.

Professional
Fitzpatrick played with the A-League's Cincinnati Riverhawks in 2002, the Columbus Shooting Stars in 2003 and the Atlanta Silverbacks in 2004, before signing with Real Salt Lake prior to team's inaugural season in 2005.

Fitzpatrick only a year in MLS, and signed a short-term contract with the Puerto Rico Islanders at the end of 2006. In May 2007 he signed with TT Pro League club W Connection until the end of 2007., and signed for the Rochester Rhinos of the USL First Division in 2008.

International
After representing the country on various youth levels, Fitzpatrick made his debut for the Trinidad and Tobago national football team on November 24, 2004 against Puerto Rico. He scored his first and only international goal thus far against Saint Vincent and the Grenadines on January 5, 2005 at the Digicel Caribbean Cup 2005. He has earned 33 caps for the Soca Warriors as of June 23, 2008.

Coaching career
He became head coach of Toronto Skillz FC of League1 Ontario in Canada.  In 2017, he used himself as a player. In 2018, he became the head coach of the George Brown College women's soccer team.

International Goals 
Scores and results list T&T's goal tally first.

Source

References

External links
 Rochester Rhinos bio
 Official Website

1978 births
Living people
Atlanta Silverbacks players
Cincinnati Riverhawks players
Columbia Lions men's soccer players
Columbus Shooting Stars players
Puerto Rico Islanders players
Real Salt Lake players
Rochester New York FC players
Trinidad and Tobago footballers
Trinidad and Tobago international footballers
USL First Division players
USL Second Division players
W Connection F.C. players
Trinidad and Tobago expatriate sportspeople in Puerto Rico
TT Pro League players
USL League Two players
A-League (1995–2004) players
Major League Soccer players
Association football midfielders
Association football defenders
Trinidad and Tobago expatriate sportspeople in the United States
Toronto Skillz FC players